François "Yo" Gourd is a Canadian political figure and entertainer, who has been involved in the Rhinoceros Party of Canada and the entartistes, two satirical political movements. He was also the Rhinoceros Party candidate in Saint-Michel in the 1979 federal election.

In 1983 Gourd opened a bar called Les Foufounes Électriques, along with Norman Boileau and Bernard Paquet — two of Gourd's friends from a musical theatre of which he was a member.  They were interested in creating a space for showcasing burgeoning alternative musicians and different types of art. According to Gourd, the bar did not turn much of a profit and he sold his share in the club after five years.  By the end of the 1980s, Boileau was the only remaining owner.

In the period that followed, he became involved in cinema. His films included Masturbation libre, le manifeste in 2007.

In 2006, he founded the second iteration of the Rhinoceros Party, the successor to the historical Rhinoceros Party dissolved in 1993. As the party's candidate in the September 17, 2007 federal by-election in Outremont, he listed his profession as poet on his nomination papers. He received 145 votes (0.61%).  The party's activities included protesting against the construction industry.

Electoral record

References

External links
 NeoRhino.ca official party site
 Les Entartistes

Quebec candidates for Member of Parliament
Living people
Rhinoceros Party of Canada candidates in the 1979 Canadian federal election
Rhinoceros Party of Canada candidates in the 1980 Canadian federal election
Rhinoceros Party of Canada candidates in the 1984 Canadian federal election
Rhinoceros Party of Canada candidates in the 1988 Canadian federal election
Independent candidates in the 1997 Canadian federal election
Canadian political party founders
Year of birth missing (living people)